Judy Illes, PHD, FRSC, FCAHS, (born April 30, 1960) is Professor of Neurology and Distinguished University Scholar in Neuroethics at the University of British Columbia. She is Director of Neuroethics Canada at UBC, and faculty in the Brain Research Centre at UBC and at the Vancouver Coastal Health Research Institute. She also holds affiliate appointments in the School of Population and Public Health and the School of Journalism at UBC, and in the Department of Computer Science and Engineering at the University of Washington in Seattle, WA. USA. She was appointed a member of the Order of Canada in 2017.

Research focus
Illes' research focuses on the ethical, legal, social and policy challenges specifically at the intersection of the neurosciences and biomedical ethics. This includes studies on advanced neurotechnologies in basic and clinical research, regenerative medicine, dementia, addiction, and the commercialization of cognitive neuroscience. She also leads a robust program of research and outreach devoted to improving the literacy of neuroscience and engaging stakeholders on a global scale.

Other activities
Illes is a pioneer of the field of neuroethics that was formally established in early 2000 to directly align biomedical ethics with neuroscience in research, clinical practice, and the commercialization of brain health. She is co-lead of the Canadian Brain Research Strategy of the International Brain Initiative, and sits on numerous advisory boards, including the Standing Committee on Ethics and the Institute for Neuroscience Mental Health and Addiction of the Canadian Institutes of Health Research. She also is a newly appointed Director-at-Large of the Canadian Academy of Health Sciences. Illes is often asked to provide expert consultation and testimony on ethics matters involving conflict of interest, neuroprivacy, and ownership of research data, governance, and regulation

Books 

 The Strategic Grant-seeker: A Guide To Conceptualizing Fundable Research in the Brain and Behavioral Sciences (1999)
 Neuroethics: Defining the issues in theory, practice, and policy (2005)
 Addiction Neuroethics: The Ethics of Addiction Neuroscience Research and Treatment (2011)
 Ethical Issues in Behavioral Neuroscience (2015)
 Oxford Handbook of Neuroethics (2013)
 Neuroethics: Anticipating the Future (2017)
 Developments in Neuroethics and Bioethics (Pain - 2018; Global Mental Health - 2019; Do it Yourself Neurotechnologies - 2020 forthcoming)

Awards and honours 
In 2017, Illes was appointed to the Order of Canada.

 Women in Neuroscience, 2004
 Women of Distinction Award Nominee, YWCA, 2009
 Mentoring Award Nominee, Nature, 2010
 Louise Hanson Marshall Special Recognition Award, Society for Neuroscience, 2011
 Patricia Price Browne Prize in Biomedical Ethics, 2018
 Martin M. Hoffman Award for Research Excellence, UBC Faculty of Medicine, 2021 
 UBC Distinguished University Scholar, 2021
 Distinguished Professor in Clinical/Applied Science, UBC Faculty of Medicine, 2021
 Prize, Italian Society of Neuroethics, Milan, Italy, 2022
 UBC Distinguished Professor in Neuroethics, 2022

See also
Neuroethics
Incidental Findings

External links
UBC Researcher Profile
National Core for Neuroethics Homepage
National Core for Neuroethics Blog
National Core for Neuroethics Annual Report 2012

Sources

1960 births
Living people
Members of the Order of Canada
Scientists from Montreal
Canadian women neuroscientists
Canada Research Chairs
Academic staff of the University of British Columbia
Stanford University alumni